Mike or Michael Schutte may refer to:

Michael Schutte (born 1979), Canadian ice hockey player
Mike Schutte (boxer) (1950–2008), South African boxer, actor, comedian and singer